Flakstad is a municipality in Nordland county, Norway. It is part of the traditional district of the island group Lofoten. The administrative centre of the municipality is the village of Ramberg. Other villages include Fredvang, Napp, Nusfjord, and Vareid.

The municipality is located in the Lofoten Islands and comprises the entire island of Flakstadøya and the northern part of the island of Moskenesøya. The European route E10 highway runs across the whole municipality.

The  municipality is the 311th largest by area out of the 356 municipalities in Norway. Flakstad is the 317th most populous municipality in Norway with a population of 1,216.

General information

The municipality of Flakstad was established on 1 January 1838 (see formannskapsdistrikt law). On 1 July 1916, the southern part of the municipality (population: 1,306) was separated to form the new Moskenes Municipality. This left Flakstad with 1,667 residents.

During the 1960s, there were many municipal mergers across Norway due to the work of the Schei Committee. On 1 January 1964, the municipality of Flakstad (population: 2,067) was merged into the neighboring municipality of Moskenes (population: 2,001), creating a new, larger municipality of Moskenes. This merger, however, only lasted for twelve years. On 1 January 1976, the merger was undone with Moskenes (population: 1,705) and Flakstad (population: 2,007) becoming separate municipalities once again.

Name
The municipality (originally the parish) is named after the old Flakstad farm (Norse Flakstaðir), since the first Flakstad Church was built there. Historically, the name was spelled "Flagstad". The first element could be a Norse nickname (flak meaning "reckless") or it could come from the word flag meaning "rock wall", possibly referring to the large cliff near the church site. The last element is staðir which means "homestead" or "farm".

Coat of arms
The coat of arms was granted on 14 July 1989. The official blazon is "Azure, a mooring bollard argent". This means the arms have a blue field (background) and the charge is a mooring bollard which is a type of fixed device used for tying a hawser line from a boat to the dock. The mooring bollard has a tincture of argent which means it is commonly colored white, but if it is made out of metal, then silver is used. The blue color in the field symbolizes the importance of the sea and the mooring bollard was chosen to represent the municipality's seafaring history. The arms were designed by Jorunn Thomassen and Jarle Henriksen.

Churches
The Church of Norway has one parish within the municipality of Flakstad. It is part of the Lofoten prosti (deanery) in the Diocese of Sør-Hålogaland.

Economy
The municipality's economy is dominated by fishing. The fishing fleet mainly consists of small boats. There are also several fish farm in Flakstad. There is some agriculture in Flakstad, but mostly cattle and sheep farming rather than growing crops.

Government
All municipalities in Norway, including Flakstad, are responsible for primary education (through 10th grade), outpatient health services, senior citizen services, unemployment and other social services, zoning, economic development, and municipal roads. The municipality is governed by a municipal council of elected representatives, which in turn elect a mayor.  The municipality falls under the Lofoten District Court and the Hålogaland Court of Appeal.

Municipal council
The municipal council  of Flakstad is made up of 11 representatives that are elected to four year terms. The party breakdown of the council is as follows:

Mayor
The mayors of Flakstad (incomplete list):
2019–present: Trond Kroken (Sp)
2015-2019: Hans Fredrik Sørdal (Ap)
2007-2015: Stein Iversen (Sp)
2005-2007: Ann-Helen Fjeldstad Jusnes (Ap)
2003-2005: Alf Ivar Samuelsen (Ap)
1986-1987: Alf Ivar Samuelsen (Ap)

Geography
Located near the southern end of the Lofoten archipelago, Flakstad comprises all of the island of Flakstadøya and the northern part of the island of Moskenesøya. The islands are connected by the Fredvang Bridges and the Kåkern Bridge. The large lake Solbjørnvatnet lies on the northern part of Moskenesøya in Flakstad.

Vestvågøy Municipality lies to the northeast on the island of Vestvågøya, the Vestfjorden lies to the southeast, the Moskenes Municipality lies to the southwest on the island of Moskenesøya, and the Norwegian Sea lies to the northwest.

Climate

Notable people 
 Fredrik Arentz Krog (1844 in Flakstad – 1923) a Norwegian barrister
 Gina Krog (1847 in Flakstad – 1916) a Norwegian suffragist, teacher, liberal politician and editor
 Birger Eriksen (1875 in Flakstad – 1958) a Norwegian officer, commander of Oscarsborg Fortress in WWII
 Sigurd Lund Hamran (1902 in Flakstad – 1977) a politician, Mayor and deputy Mayor of Moskenes between 1937 & 1961 
 Alf Ivar Samuelsen (1942 in Flakstad – 2014) a Norwegian politician and Mayor of in Flakstad

References

External links
Municipal fact sheet from Statistics Norway 

 
Lofoten
Municipalities of Nordland
Populated places of Arctic Norway
1838 establishments in Norway
1964 disestablishments in Norway
1976 establishments in Norway